Kolkata Metro Line 2, also known as the East-West Metro and Green Line, is a rapid transit line of the Kolkata Metro in the Indian state of West Bengal. It currently consists of an operational section between Salt Lake and Sealdah, and will eventually connect Howrah by going underneath the Hooghly River, with an eastern extension also planned for Teghoria. It is expected to derive a very high ridership since it will connect India's two largest commuter railway and long-distance railway terminals (Howrah and (Sealdah) along with two of its largest business districts (BBD Bagh and Salt Lake Sector V). It will also be connecting the industrial hub of Kolkata i.e. Howrah and the IT hub of Kolkata i.e. Sector 5. Line 2 has India's biggest underwater metro tunnel along with the deepest metro shaft. In the deepest metro shaft, Howrah metro station will be the deepest metro station in India, which will be 33 meters deep.The first phase between Salt Lake Sector V and Salt Lake Stadium was inaugurated by Union Railway Minister Piyush Goyal on 13 February 2020 and commercial services started from 14 February 2020.

History
The master plan had already identified the corridor way back in 1971. But the success of the Delhi Metro contributed to the sanction of the East – West Metro corridor, which will connect Howrah Railway Station with the Satellite City of Salt Lake. In January 2004, the Pacific Consultant International Group conducted a feasibility study for the line. The report proposed the route and tubular structures be under the Hooghly River.

A new organisation called the Kolkata Metro Rail Corporation Limited (KMRC) was formed, which will be executing the operations of this Line, commencing construction in 2009. Of KMRC's eight directors, four each were from the state and central governments. The cost was being shared between the state government (30 per cent), the Union Urban Development Ministry (25 per cent), and the Japan Bank for International Cooperation (JBIC) (45 per cent). But as of 2011, after state government dis-invested from the project, most of the share of this project went to Indian Railways and with Japan Bank for International Cooperation (JBIC).

But due to major setbacks, such as land acquisition, slum relocation, and route alignment problems, the project got delayed. The East-West Corridor was originally slated to be operational by 2012, but was later pushed back to 2015. The project will now be implemented in four phases. The first phase, from Salt Lake Sector V to Salt Lake Stadium, became operational on 13 February 2020. The second phase, to Phoolbagan opened on 4 October 2020, operational from 5 October 2020. The third phase to Sealdah is operational from 14 July 2022 and the final phase which includes the journey through the tubular tunnels under the Ganges will be operational by 2023.

Current status

 Elevated Corridor: The elevated section for Phase 1 is complete, including last trials. Commercial operations  started on 14 February 2020.
 Tunnel for Phase 2: The construction of the 5490 metre tunnel has been completed. This section was constructed by ITD-ITD Cementation JV.
 Underground Stations for Phase 2: The works at Phoolbagan station is complete and it is operational from 04 October 2020.
Underground Stations for Phase 3: The Sealdah station is now complete and has inaugurated by Union Minister Smriti Irani and is available for commercial usage from 14 July 2022. 
 Tunnel for Phase 3: Tunneling work for phase 3 is complete. However, work at the shaft at Durga Pithuri Lane is ongoing. 
 Underground Stations for Phase 4: Howrah Maidan, Howrah, Mahakaran and the new Esplanade are structurally complete.
Tunnel work for phase 4: Both tunnels for phase 4 is complete. Tunneling between Esplanade and Sealdah was completed on 9 October 2020 and between Sealdah and Bowbazar shaft completed on 15 May 2021. Retrieval of the TBMs and covering of the shaft is on-going.
 Train Depot: Construction, electrical and mechanical work have been completed and it is presently operational.

Timeline 

2009: Contract for building the overground stations and viaduct awarded to Gammon and Simplex Infrastructure.
2009: Contract for building the underground section from Subhash Sarabor to Central Station awarded to ITD-ITD Cementation JV.
2009-February: Physical Construction of EW corridor starts.
2010: Contract for building the underground section from Central to Howrah Maidan awarded to Afcons.
2012: KMRC awards rolling stock contract to Spain's Construcciones y Auxiliar de Ferrocarriles (CAF).
2012: Realignment proposed to avoid shifting of 80 families from Bowbazar and hawkers from Brabourne Road.
2014: CAF withdraws from the KMRC rolling stock contract due to cost escalation.
2015: Realignment approved by Railways and JICA in between Sealdah to Howrah station.
2015: Subodh Mullick Square station, a key stop in the revised blueprint, done away with to avoid eviction of hawkers.
2016-February: Rolling stock contract for 14 rakes having 6 coaches awarded to BEML.
2017-January: Structural and Roofing work of all elevated stations completed.
Elevated section is to be made of steel girders.
2017-March: Afcons nicknames the tunnel boring machine as Prerna and Rachna inspired from the names of daughter of their employee.
2017-May 23: First TBM completes tunneling the East bound tunnel under the Hoogly river.
2017-June 21: Second TBM completes tunneling the West bound tunnel under the river Hoogly.
2017-June: Permission received from Archaeological Survey of India for construction of tunnel within  of three heritage buildings.
2017-July: Tram depot at Esplanade shifted to facilitate construction of Metro Station.
2017-July: People from 11 buildings in Brebourne Road evacuated in phased manner when the TBM's passes below these old buildings.
2017-August: Mini-bus stand at Mahakaran shifted to facilitate the construction of underground station.
2017-September: Panasonic Manufacturing and Zhuzhou CRRC Times Electric have been awarded contract of platform screen door on all 12 stations.
2017-October: 365 m of elevated section at Duttabad completed using steel girders.
2017-December: Tunnelling between Mahakaran station and Esplanade station ongoing.
2017-December: KMRC declares first phase to be in between Sector V and IFA Salt Lake Stadium instead of Phoolbagan to be inaugurated in June 2018.
2018-January: Demo coach arrives at IFA Salt Lake Metro Depot. People question its use.
2018-February 12: Metro general manager Mr. Ajay Vijayvargiya again postpones opening of first phase from June to September 2018.
2018-February: Constantly KMRC and Railways have postponed the opening of Phase 1 (the new deadline was before October 2018) and truncated the route for Phase 1 from Sealdah to Phoolbagan and now only till Salt lake Sec V.
2018-March 23: First TBM named Prerna reaches Esplanade station completing the section from Howrah Maidan to Esplanade. This tunnel will be used by Howrah bound tunnel.
2018-March 31: BEML delivers first metro train set to KMRC. The train sets to arrive in 20 days. Second train set will be delivered in the end of April.
2018-April 5: Second TBM completes boring of second tunnel between Howrah Maidan and Esplanade station.
2018-April 20: First metro rake arrives at IFA Salt Lake Depot.
2018-May 1: The second metro rake from BEML arrives.
2018-June 20: First test ride inside depot starts.
2018-June 27: Work at Esplanade Sealdah tunnel drilling stalled due to existing steel structure in North South Line.
2018-July 4: First trial run between Central Park and Sector V.
2018-July: October deadline of inauguration announced
2018-August: Tunneling from Esplanade to Sealdah suspend due to detection of underground steel beams of Line 1.
2018-August: Due to fund crunch & other issues, initial run postponed to March 2019.
2018-August 30: Installation of Platform Screen Doors started in Karunamoyee and Central Park stations.
2018-October: Trial Runs conducted between Sector V and IFA Salt Lake Stadium stations.
2018-November: Trial Runs conducted by RDSO between Sector V and IFA Salt Lake Stadium stations.
2018-November: Speed limit of trains plying in Line 1 decreased for removing steel beams.
2018-November: Small tunnels being made using NATM method at Esplanade to remove steel beams left during North-South Metro construction in 1980s.
2018-December: Issues in software detected.
2019-January-25: Tunneling on Esplanade Sealdah section begins. TBM named Chandi starts its initial push from Esplanade station. It will take 12–15 months to complete the tunnelling.
2019-February-19: Second boring machine named Urvi starts tunnelling from Esplanade station.
2019-February: Fare chart released.
2019-April: Glitches detected during software integration while negotiating curves in line (First phase of the project till Salt Lake Stadium). Glitches have been fixed, and the signalling and communication firm Ansaldo STS has recommended 1000 hours of trial run before commencement of service.
2019-April: Inauguration delayed again. Misses April end deadline. New deadline June
2019-May: Tunnel boring machine Urvi and Chandi after initial slow start progressing steadily towards Sealdah.
2019-May-18: Gets RDSO clearance, and railway board nod.
2019-May-31: Electrification of third rail and trail run in underground section from IFA Salt Lake Stadium  & Phoolbagan stations. It was the first time after 1995 that a metro trial was held underground.
2019-June-14: Inspection by fire department. Says, inadequate emergency exits in Bengal Chemical & IFA Saltlake Stadium stations.
2019-June-15: Gets international safety nod from French certifier.
2019-July-3: TBMs Rachna & Prerna successfully taken out from Curzon Park
2019-July-7: Fire dept. assures temporary permission to the 2 stations, Bengal Chemical & IFA Saltlake Stadium stations. NOC to be valid for a year.
2019-July-18: Operations handed over to Metro Railway, Kolkata from Kolkata Metro Rail Corporation
2019-July-23: CRS inspection and safety audit for initial run. But, Fire department delayed the NOC.
2019-July-30: Opening rescheduled on September. Smart Card released. Employees of Metro Railway, Kolkata being trained by Kolkata Metro Rail Corporation.
2019-August-02: CRS nod given, with 3 month validity of the clearance.
2019-August-12: India's deepest metro station, Howrah finishes structural construction. It took 17 months.
2019-August-21: Trial till Sealdah crossover and 7-day mock trial started.
2019-September-01: Tunnel boring machine Chandi hits an aquifer causing massive soil settlement. Multiple buildings damaged, hundreds had to be moved to hotels
2019-October: By the mid of the month, the land was stabled by grouting and no more subsidence recorded. High Court ordered to stop tunneling, till further notice.
2019-October-30: First round of service trials started.
 2019 October: The first phase of this line was scheduled to start its first commercial run on 24 October, the same day when the first metro in India Kolkata Metro Line 1 was inaugurated in 1984
2019-October-24: But the date was postponed to 7 November for some technical reasons.
2019-October-30: Second round of service trials started.
2019 November-8: The Metro Authority was also unable to start its inaugural run on 7 November also. Failure drill started and performed till 18 November.
2019-November-26: Initial CRS deadline expired. 3 months grace period given. Valid till 29 February 2020.
2019-December: New opening date planned, i.e. December end. But, it is missed again.
2020-January-07: High Court asks Railways to file report on resuming East- West Metro tunneling work, that was stopped after Bowbazar mishap.
2020-January-28: 2022 is the revised deadline of the entire corridor.
2020-February-03: Last group of 2 families moved to new flats from hotel after the Bowbazar mishap. Final inauguration date announced. Rail Minister to flag off services on 13 February.
2020-February-11: Last trails, known as 'time-table trials' conducted. High Court gives nod to resume construction in Bowbazar area.
2020-February-13: First phase from Salt Lake Sector V to IFA Salt Lake Stadium inaugurated.
2020-February-14: Commercial services start.
2020-February-28: Tunneling resumed in Bowbazar area, and cracks redevelop in buildings.
2020-March: All operations and constructions stopped due to country-wide coronavirus lockdown.
2020-June-18: IFA Salt Lake Stadium to Phoolbagan section gets CRS nod.
2020-August-10: India's deepest evacuation shaft on Strand Road gets completed.
2020-October-2: the Vidyapati Setu (Sealdah Flyover) has been closed by Kolkata Police due to the work of making tunnel by TBM under this dilapidated bridge has started.
2020-October-4: Services extended up to Phoolbagan.
2020-October-8: Indian Football Association, West Bengal has announced that the name of Salt Lake Stadium Metro Station has renamed as IFA Salt Lake Stadium.
2020-October-9: Work on the eastbound tunnel (towards Salt Lake Sector V) has been completed, TBM Urvi entered the under Construction Sealdah metro station on around 5 PM. Earlier, on 4 October 2020 the Vidyapati Setu (Sealdah Flyover) reopened by Kolkata Police for vehicular traffic as the tunneling work has completed 13 hours before.
2021-January-4: TBM Urvi starts bridging the last  gap of E-W Metro tunnel from Sealdah to Esplanade.
2021-May-15: TBM Urvi reaches Bowbazar shaft. Last tunneling section of the entire project completed.
2022-July-12: Services extended up to Sealdah.

Tunneling (Phase 2) 

The section between Sealdah and Mahakaran station was realigned due to the objection of Government of West Bengal. Work at Howrah Maidan has started in March 2016. The section between Howrah Maidan and Esplanade station has been built by the Afcons – Transtonnelstroy JV team, two tunnel boring machines from Herrenknecht are being used to dig the tunnel. Tunnelling started from Howrah Maidan side, by Afcons. On 23 May 2017 one of the TBM named Rachna completed the tunneling under the Hoogly river in 36 days. The other TBM named Prerna also completed the tunnelling work under the river on 21 June 2017. There were some concerns during tunneling under Brabourne road as the tunnel would pass within  of heritage structures and there were also many old and dilapidated buildings in this section. KMRC received permission from Archaeological Survey of India in June 2017. Residents and shops in the old building were temporarily shifted and the buildings were reinforced before construction of tunnel. Construction of tunnel to Mahakaran station was completed in November 2017. For the Mahakaran-Esplanade section, tunneling has been completed on 23 March 2018. The other tunnel has also been completed by April. In these sections, above ground retail buildings have been shifted in a phased manner prior to tunnelling. The Esplanade – Sealdah section will be executed by ITD Cementation JV and started in May 2018. The Esplanade - Sealdah section has been delayed due to the detection of steel beams that were left during the construction of the first line of Kolkata Metro. The NATM tunneling method is being used to cut the steel beams. This work was concluded in February 2019 and then the main tunneling commenced. In September 2019, when TBM Chandi reached Bowbazar, it hit a massive aquafier, less than a kilometer from its destination, Sealdah. It led to soil subsidence and many buildings collapsed. The residents were shifted to hotels and apartments. Later the land was stabilized by grouting and the unsafe buildings were pulled down. High Court ordered to stop further tunneling immediately. Due to the incident the tunneling was delayed, thus delaying the overall deadline for one year. It was planned that the affected TBM would be taken out from the incident site, and the second one will complete the tunneling till Sealdah. Then it will be reversed again to complete the remaining portion of the tunnel of first TBM. In mid-February 2020, High Court asked to resume the work in the affected area.

List of stations (East to West)

Inauguration

1st phase
On 3 February 2020, the final inauguration date was revealed. After 11 years, since the construction started, the first phase of the line was inaugurated on 13 February by Union Minister of Railways Piyush Goyal, with commercial services to start the very next day. The service will start from 8 am and ends at 8 pm, with 37 pairs of services a day. 5 rakes would run at a frequency of 20 minutes. Dipak Kumar drove the first train.

In October 2021, services up to Phoolbagan were extended as a part of Phase 1A.

2nd Phase
On 14 July 2022, the first commercial run from Sealdah metro station was made, as a part of Phase 2.

Infrastructure

Stations
All the stations in this line will be equipped with Platform Screen Doors to keep people away from the tracks. Mott MacDonald is the detailed design consultant for all the elevated stations, whereas Lee Harris Pomeroy Architects have designed all the underground stations. Out of the 6 underground stations, 3 will be built by ITD Cementation, a part of Italian-Thai Development Public Company and the other 3 will be built by Afcons including the 520 meters underwater stretch. All the elevated stations will be built by Kolkata based Simplex Infrastructure ltd.

Escalators and elevators 
Ninety escalators and forty elevators are to be installed at different levels in the line to facilitate smooth mobility of passengers including physically challenged & aged persons. LOA for installation of forty-one escalators and twenty-six elevators for 8 nos. stations of Phase-I has been awarded.

Tunnel Ventilation System (TVS) 
TVS shall provide a means to control smoke flow and ensure safe evacuation of passengers in case of fire as well as maintain an acceptable environment in the tunnel and station track way. Tender for the TVS was invited and the bids of eligible tenderers are being evaluated.

Platform Screen Doors (PSDs) 
PSDs are a system of full height/half height motorized sliding doors that provide controlled access to the trains and protect the platform edge. PSD work for 6 elevated and 2 underground stations have been completed.

Electrification, Signaling & Automatic Fare Collection 
The line will have two types of signaling equipment supplied by ANSALDO STS . One will feature cab signaling and continuous automatic train control with automatic train protection. The other signaling equipment will include an integrated system featuring fiber optic cable, SCADA, radios and a PA system. The line will also have a train information system, control telephones and a centralized clock system.  Contract for AFC works has been awarded to M/s. Indra Sistemas SA (Spain).

Operations
Unlike the north–south corridor, the east–west metro will run from 8 am to 8 pm at a frequency of 1.5 minutes during peak hours and 5 minutes during non-peak hours. But in phase 1 operations, the frequency will be 20 minutes, and each will stop for 20 seconds in each station.

Rolling stock

CAF in collaboration with Melco was to supply 14 trains for this line. The 14 rakes were acquired at a cost of approximately €110m . Each rake will compose of 6 coaches having a capacity of 2068 people per train. The maximum speed of the train will be . The first lot of trains was to be manufactured in Spain and imported to Kolkata in November 2014. The next lot was to be manufactured in India. However, the tender was cancelled by KMRC due to technical reasons and excessive delay in project. And a re-tender was issued in July 2015. BEML emerged as the only bidder in the fourth round of bidding for providing rolling stock. Thus, the contract for providing the rakes was awarded to BEML. BEML have earlier provided rakes for Delhi Metro, Bengaluru Metro & Jaipur Metro. Fourteen rakes, each with six coaches, were ordered. Out of Fourteen, eleven rakes have already been received by KMRC.

Proposed Extensions
The West Bengal government have proposed an extension to the East–West Metro line. In this proposal the East-West Metro will be connected again to the Dum Dum Airport-New Garia Metro in Teghoria (Haldiram). According to this proposal the East-West Metro will have 3 terminating stations at Howrah Maidan, Sector V and the proposed Teghoria station. In Teghoria, it will be connected to the NSCBI Airport-New Garia metro route (VIP Road Station) and interconnection facilities will be present. It was previously planned that the extension and the present route would converge at the Central Park Station. But now the plan is changed and it is decided to extend the line directly from Salt Lake Sector V Station. The proposed extension is under study and it will need several clearances before being implemented. 10 km East-West Metro extension project from Howrah Maidan to Santragachi bus terminus had been proposed. RITES, the implementing agency for this project planned to start work on the corridor early in 2017.

Gallery

See also
Kolkata Metro
List of Kolkata metro stations
Kolkata Metro Rolling Stock
List of rapid transit systems
Trams in Kolkata
Kolkata Lightrail
Kolkata Monorail
Kolkata Suburban Railway

References

External links
Official Website for line 2

Kolkata Metro lines
Kolkata Metro